Elliot Greenebaum (born 1977) is an American film writer and director, best known for his award-winning debut movie, Assisted Living. He also appeared in the role of Chip Wright in the 1990 Disney TV movie A Mom for Christmas.

Background
Elliot Greenebaum was born in Concord MA and raised in Louisville, Kentucky. He graduated from Amherst college in 1999 with a degree in philosophy and received his masters in film from NYU in 2005. .

In 2003 he won Slamdance Grand Jury Prize best feature for his indie film Assisted Living which is the fictional story of an unlikely friendship in a nursing home. The film was shot in a working assisted living facility and used residents and staff as actors mixed in with the professional actors.  Filmmaker Magazine chose Greenebaum as 50 Filmmakers to Watch and in 2005 he appeared on The Charlie Rose Show.

Recognition

Awards and nominations
 2003, Won Slamdance Film Festival Jury Prize for Best Dramatic Feature for Assisted Living
 2003, Won Gen Art Film Festival Best Picture for Assisted Living
 2003, Won Gen Art Film Festival Audience Award for Best Feature for Assisted Living
 2003, Won Slamdance Film Festival Grand Jury Sparky Award for Assisted Living
 2003, Won Woodstock Film Festival Jury Prize for Assisted Living
 2003, Won Savannah Film Festival Best Narrative for Assisted Living

References

External links
 

1977 births
Living people
American male screenwriters
People from Brooklyn
Writers from Louisville, Kentucky
Amherst College alumni
Tisch School of the Arts alumni
Film directors from New York City
Film directors from Kentucky
Screenwriters from New York (state)